Henri Lobe Manga Bell was the second child of King Auguste Manga Ndumbe Bell of the Duala people of Kamerun, and younger brother of King Rudolf Duala Manga Bell. He was married to Olga Welly.

Manga Bell, Henri Lobe